Harold Hoskins may refer to:
 Harold K. Hoskins (1927–2012), American pilot and Tuskegee Airman
 Harold B. Hoskins (1895–1977, American businessman, diplomat and expert on the Middle East
 Gator Hoskins (Harold Hoskins, born 1991), American football tight end